Laura Celestia "Cettie" Spelman Rockefeller (September 9, 1839 – March 12, 1915) was an American abolitionist, philanthropist, school teacher, and prominent member of the Rockefeller family. Her husband was Standard Oil co-founder John D. Rockefeller. Spelman College in Atlanta, Georgia, and the Laura Spelman Rockefeller Memorial were named for her.

Early life
Laura Celestia Spelman was born in Wadsworth, Ohio, to Puritan descendant Harvey Buell Spelman (1811–1881) and Lucy Henry (1818–1897), Yankees who had moved to Ohio from Massachusetts. Harvey was an abolitionist who was active in the Congregationalist Church, the Underground Railroad, and in politics.  The Spelmans eventually moved to Cleveland, Ohio.  Spelman had an elder adopted sister, Lucy Maria "Lute" Spelman (c. 1837–1920).

Personal life and career
In Cleveland, Lute and Spelman met John Davison Rockefeller while attending accounting classes together. He was the eldest son of William Avery "Bill" Rockefeller (1810–1906) and Eliza Davison (1813–1889).

She later returned to New England to attend Oread Institute, with plans to become a schoolteacher. After returning to Ohio to teach, she married John in 1864. Following her wedding, Spelman remained active in the church (she joined Rockefeller's congregation, the Northern Baptists) and with her family. Once the family business, Standard Oil, began to take off, she further devoted her time to philanthropy and her children.

Together, they were the parents of five children; 
 Elizabeth ("Bessie") (August 23, 1866 – November 14, 1906), 
 Alice (July 14, 1869 – August 20, 1870), 
 Alta (April 12, 1871 – June 21, 1962), 
 Edith (August 31, 1872 – August 25, 1932), and 
 John Jr. (January 29, 1874 – May 11, 1960).

Throughout their lives, the Rockefeller family continued to donate ten percent of their income to charity, including substantial donations to Spelman College, founded to educate Black women. Laura Spelman Rockefeller died on March 12, 1915, at age 75 of a heart attack, at the family estate Kykuit in Pocantico Hills, New York.

Legacy
John D. Rockefeller established the Laura Spelman Rockefeller Memorial Fund. He donated large amounts to it and it funded charitable organizations and then shifted focus to social sciences funding.
Laura Spelman founded Spelman College.

See also
 Rockefeller Foundation 
 Philanthropy

References

Further reading
Rockefeller Archive Center
Harvey Buell Spelman
Lucy Henry

External links

1839 births
1915 deaths
Rockefeller family
American abolitionists
American philanthropists
People from Cleveland
History of Cleveland
People from Wadsworth, Ohio
19th-century American educators
Schoolteachers from Ohio
Baptists from New York (state)
19th-century American women educators